Climate change in Connecticut encompasses the effects of climate change, attributed to man-made increases in atmospheric carbon dioxide, in the U.S. state of Connecticut.

The United States Environmental Protection Agency reports that:

"Connecticut's climate is changing. The state has warmed two to three degrees (F) in the last century. Throughout the northeastern United States, spring is arriving earlier and bringing more precipitation, heavy rainstorms are more frequent, and summers are hotter and drier. Sea level is rising, and severe storms increasingly cause floods that damage property and infrastructure. In the coming decades, changing the climate is likely to increase flooding, harm ecosystems, disrupt farming, and increase some risks to human health".

Environmental impacts

Increasing temperature and changing precipitation patterns

According to the Hartford Courant, "[i]ntense rainfall is becoming common across the state. Violent storms are expected to hit more often". The EPA further reports:

"Rising temperatures and shifting rainfall patterns are likely to increase the intensity of both floods and droughts. Average annual precipitation in the Northeast increased 10 percent from 1895 to 2011, and precipitation from extremely heavy storms has increased 70 percent since 1958. During the next century, average annual precipitation and the frequency of heavy downpours are likely to keep rising. Average precipitation is likely to increase during winter and spring, but not change significantly during summer and fall. Rising temperatures will melt snow earlier in spring and increase evaporation, and thereby dry the soil during summer and fall. So flooding is likely to be worse during winter and spring, and droughts worse during summer and fall".

Sea level rise, wetland loss, and coastal flooding

According to the Hartford Courant, the levels of the Long Island Sound "have been rising for decades, and its waters are warming. So is Connecticut's air. Shoreline flooding is more frequent". The EPA further reports:

"Rising sea level erodes wetlands and beaches and increases damage from coastal storms. Tidal wetlands are inherently vulnerable because of their low elevations, and shoreline development prevents them from migrating inland onto higher ground. Human activities such as filling wetlands have destroyed about one third of New England’s coastal wetlands since the early 1800s. Wetlands provide habitat for many bird species, such as osprey and heron, as well as several fish species. Losing coastal wetlands would harm coastal ecosystems and remove an important line of defense against coastal flooding. Coastal cities and towns will become more vulnerable to storms in the coming century as sea level rises, shorelines erode, and storm surges become higher. Storms can destroy coastal homes, wash out highways and rail lines, and damage essential communication, energy, and wastewater management infrastructure".

Exacerbating the flood risks generated by ecosystem degradation, the state allows significant development to occur in floodplains and high-flood-risk areas. Indeed, new housing has been built between 2010 and 2019 in areas with high projected flood rates at three times the rate of non-risky areas. Though Connecticut state has tried to arrange buyback programs for housing and land on floodplains, cities and municipalities have fought back in many cases to protect their tax base.

Economic and social impacts

Ecosystems and agriculture

"Warmer temperatures cause cows to eat less and produce less milk. That could reduce the output of Connecticut’s $70-million dairy industry, which provides 13 percent of the state’s farm revenue. Some farms may be harmed if more hot days and droughts reduce crop yields, or if more flooding and wetter springs delay their planting dates. Other farms may benefit from a longer growing season and the fertilizing effect of carbon dioxide".

Human health

"The risk of some diseases carried by insects may increase. The ticks that transmit Lyme disease are active when temperatures are above 45°F, so warmer winters could lengthen the season during which ticks can become infected or people can be exposed to the ticks. Higher temperatures would also make more of New England warm enough for the Asian tiger mosquito, a common carrier of West Nile virus. The number of cases may or may not increase, depending on what people do to control insect populations and avoid insect bites".

Responses

State policy

In December 2019, Connecticut joined consideration for a multi-state gasoline cap-and-trade program. The plan aims to reduce transportation-related tailpipe emissions, and would levy a tax on fuel companies based on carbon dioxide emissions. The most ambitious version of the plan is projected to reduce the area's tailpipe emissions by 25% between 2022 and 2032. The program is in the public comment phase, with individual states determining whether to participate. The program could begin as early as 2022.

Connecticut v ExxonMobil Corp

See also 
 Plug-in electric vehicles in Connecticut
 List of U.S. states and territories by carbon dioxide emissions

References

Further reading 
 -- this chapter of the National Climate Assessment covers Northeast states

Connecticut
Environment of Connecticut